Ankazotsifantatra is a rural commune located in Atsinanana at the east coast of Madagascar.

Its economy is based on agriculture, notably coffee and cloves.

References

Populated places in Atsinanana